Ambros Sollid (born 21 May 1880, died 9 February 1973) was a Norwegian agronomist and politician.

He was born in Heddal to teacher Ambros Torgrimsen Sollid and Gunhild Smedsrud. He was elected representative to the Storting for the period 1937–1945, for the Liberal Party.

Sollid was elected member of the municipal council of Skien from 1928 to 1937, and served as mayor 1935–1937.

Selected works
Telemark Landbruksselskap 1777–1877 (1927)
Felleskjøpet gjennom 50 år 1896–1946 (1946)

References

1880 births
1973 deaths
People from Notodden
Norwegian agronomists
Liberal Party (Norway) politicians
Members of the Storting
Mayors of places in Telemark